Fireheart Tiger is a 2021 fantasy novella by Aliette de Bodard.

Themes 
Science fiction critic Gary K. Wolfe stated that the book "more directly addresses complex questions of colonialism and the fraught negotiations needed to keep an independent nation from being overwhelmed by more powerful neighbors." Other reviewers noted the presence of themes such as power dynamics in personal relationships, as well as female and queer representation.

In an interview, de Bordard stated that the book was inspired by the tradition of Vietnamese and Chinese court dramas. In an other interview, she stated that:

Reception 
Writing for Locus magazine, Liz Bourke described the book as "gorgeous and moving, with a sense of scale and an intimate, personal engagement with compelling characters," and added that it "is a worthy addition to de Bodard’s body of work." For Tor.com, Maya Gittelman stated that it was "a lush, sharp, and evocative novella. It’s a quick read that brims with aching beauty, intricate emotion, and surprising twists of magic."

The Mary Sue listed the book as one of its 15 most anticipated diverse SFF releases for 2021.

Accolades 
 Fireheart Tiger has been nominated for the Nebula Award for Best Novella and the BSFA Award for Best Short Fiction.

References 

Novellas
LGBT speculative fiction novels